The 2008 Boston College Eagles football team represented Boston College during the 2008 NCAA Division I FBS football season. It was Boston College's fourth season as a member of the Atlantic Coast Conference (ACC). The Eagles were led by Jeff Jagodzinski in his second and final season as Boston College head coach. Boston College has been a member of the Atlantic Coast Conference's (ACC) Atlantic Division since joining the league in 2005, after leaving the Big East Conference. The Eagles played their home games in 2008 at Alumni Stadium in Chestnut Hill, Massachusetts, which has been their home stadium since 1957.

Season recap
Boston College had to replace Matt Ryan, who was drafted third overall in the 2008 NFL Draft by the Atlanta Falcons. Senior quarterback Chris Crane was the starter at the beginning of the year to take over the starting quarterback position. In the November 22 game against Wake Forest, Crane broke his collar bone, and was replaced with Dominique Davis. Other big losses that had to be dealt with from the 2007 season include tailback L.V. Witworth and running back Andre Callender. True freshman Josh Haden was assumed to be the starting running back, but true freshman Montel Harris later turned out to have the starting job. BC finished the year with one of the best defenses in College Football, with the most Interceptions in all of FBS Football, and allowing the fifth fewest yards.

The team had its first loss in a home game against Georgia Tech. It went on to lose two more games against the North Carolina and the Clemson before winning four games in a row to take the team to its second ACC Championship Game in a row, which again, put the Eagles against the Virginia Tech Hokies. The Eagles lost the game 12–30, and placed the team in the Gaylord Hotels Music City Bowl in Nashville, Tennessee. The Eagles lost the game to Vanderbilt, which not only ended the Eagles bowl winning streak, which was the longest in the nation, but gave Vanderbilt its first bowl win in over 50 years. On January 5, 2009, Coach Jagodzinski was fired by Boston College, for apparently interviewing for the head coaching vacancy for the NFL New York Jets despite being warned not to.  He was later hired as the offensive coordinator for the Tampa Bay Buccaneers.

Schedule

Rankings

Roster

Drafted Players (2009 NFL Draft)

References

Boston College
Boston College Eagles football seasons
Boston College Eagles football
Boston College Eagles football